Umar Sadiq Mesbah (born 2 February 1997) is a Nigerian professional footballer who plays as a forward for La Liga club Real Sociedad and the Nigeria national team.

Sadiq formerly represented the Nigeria national under-23 team and was an important member of the squad that won a bronze medal at the 2016 Summer Olympics.

Club career

Early years
Born in Kaduna, Sadiq started playing football on the streets of his hometown at an early age. He later played for local team Kusa Boys, before joining the Future of Africa Football Academy and finally the Football College Abuja. In June 2013, Sadiq traveled with FCA to Croatia and participated at the Kvarnerska Rivijera youth tournament. He finished as the competition's top scorer and helped his team become the champions.

Spezia
Following his promising performances in Croatia, Sadiq was acquired by Italian club Spezia. He failed to make any first-team appearances, but played regularly for the youth setup. In the 2014–15 season, Sadiq became the Campionato Primavera top scorer, tallying an impressive 26 goals in 24 games.

Loan to Lavagnese
Shortly upon joining Spezia, Sadiq was loaned to Serie D side Lavagnese, making his senior debut in the final round of the 2013–14 season.

Loan to Roma
In July 2015, Sadiq joined Roma on a one-year loan. He was transferred alongside his teammate and compatriot Nura Abdullahi for €250,000 each with a buyout clause of €1,250 million per player. Having bagged eight goals in his first three Primavera matches for Roma, Sadiq made his Serie A debut on 21 November, replacing Juan Iturbe after 88 minutes in a 2–2 away draw against Bologna. He scored his first goal on 20 December, netting only seven minutes after coming on as an 82nd-minute substitute for Mohamed Salah, helping his team to a 2–0 home win over Genoa. On 6 January 2016, Sadiq bagged his second goal in his first start for Roma, opening the scoring in the 7th minute of an eventual 3–3 away draw against Chievo. He finished the season with two goals in six Serie A appearances.

Roma
On 21 June 2016, it was announced that Roma exercised the option and signed Sadiq, as well as Nura, permanently until 30 June 2020. He traveled with the first team to the United States for the 2017 International Champions Cup, scoring in his only appearance against Paris Saint-Germain, as Roma lost after penalties.

Loan to Bologna
On 31 August 2016, Sadiq was sent on loan to Bologna until the end of the season with a purchase option. He appeared in seven Serie A games, before returning to Roma.

Loan to Torino
On 16 August 2017, it was announced that Sadiq would be joining Torino on loan until 30 June 2018. The deal included an option to make the move permanent with a buyback clause in favour of Roma.

Loan to NAC Breda
In January 2018, Sadiq moved on a six-month loan to Dutch side NAC Breda with an extension option. He helped the club narrowly avoid relegation, contributing with five goals in 12 Eredivisie appearances.

Loan to Rangers
In July 2018, Sadiq joined Scottish Premiership side Rangers on a season-long loan. After just four first-team appearances in all competitions, his loan spell was terminated by the end of the year.

Loan to Perugia
In January 2019, Sadiq joined Serie B side Perugia for the remainder of the season. He scored three times in 17 appearances, helping his team to an eight-place finish with a chance to win promotion to Serie A via the playoffs. However, Perugia lost in the preliminary round to Verona after extra time.

Loan to Partizan
In early July 2019, Sadiq completed his loan move to Serbian club Partizan that included an option to buy. He made his official debut in a 1–0 away league win against Inđija on 21 July. On 4 August, Sadiq netted his first goal for the club in a 4–0 home league victory over Mačva Šabac. He subsequently scored the opener in an eventual 3–1 home win versus Turkish club Yeni Malatyaspor in the first leg of the Europa League third qualifying round. Sadiq played his first Eternal derby on 22 September in a 2–0 win over bitter rivals Red Star. Sadiq spent 64 minutes on the field when he was replaced by Seydouba Soumah. On 3 October, he netted a brace to give his team a 2–1 away victory against Astana in Europa League's Group L. He scored his first senior hat-trick in a 6–2 home league win over Javor Ivanjica on 22 November.

Almería
On 5 October 2020, Sadiq joined Spanish Segunda División side UD Almería on a five-year contract.

Real Sociedad
On 1 September 2022, Sadiq signed a contract with Real Sociedad until the end of the 2027–28 season. Only two days later Sadiq scored first goal on his debut in a 1–1 home draw against Atlético Madrid.

International career

In July 2016, Sadiq was named in Nigeria's final 18-man squad for the 2016 Summer Olympics. He appeared in all six of his team's games and scored four goals in the process, including a brace in the third-place victory over Honduras.

After a two successful seasons at Partizan and a move to the rising Almería, Sadiq received a call to the Nigerian national team called up for the 2022 African Cup of Nations qualifying matches against Benin and Lesotho on 27 and 30 March 2021 respectively.

Career statistics

Club

International

Scores and results list Nigeria's goal tally first, score column indicates score after each Sadiq goal.

Honours
Roma Primavera
Campionato Nazionale Primavera: 2015–16

Almería
Segunda División: 2021–22

Nigeria U23
Olympic Games bronze medal: 2016

References

External links

 Profile at the Real Sociedad website
 
 
 
 

Living people
1997 births
Sportspeople from Kaduna
Nigerian footballers
Association football forwards
Nigeria international footballers
2021 Africa Cup of Nations players
Footballers at the 2016 Summer Olympics
Medalists at the 2016 Summer Olympics
Olympic bronze medalists for Nigeria
Olympic footballers of Nigeria
Olympic medalists in football
Serie A players
Serie B players
Serie D players
Eredivisie players
Scottish Professional Football League players
Serbian SuperLiga players
Segunda División players
Spezia Calcio players
U.S.D. Lavagnese 1919 players
A.S. Roma players
Bologna F.C. 1909 players
Torino F.C. players
NAC Breda players
Rangers F.C. players
A.C. Perugia Calcio players
FK Partizan players
UD Almería players
Real Sociedad footballers
Nigerian expatriate footballers
Nigerian expatriate sportspeople in Italy
Expatriate footballers in Italy
Nigerian expatriate sportspeople in Scotland
Expatriate footballers in Scotland
Nigerian expatriate sportspeople in Serbia
Expatriate footballers in Serbia
Nigerian expatriate sportspeople in Spain
Expatriate footballers in Spain
Nigerian expatriate sportspeople in the Netherlands
Expatriate footballers in the Netherlands